Wallsend F.C. was an English association football club based in the town of Wallsend, Northumberland.

History
The club was founded in 1890 under the name Wallsend Park Villa. The team won the Gateshead Cup in 1893–94 and again the following season when they combined it with victory in the Northumberland Junior League. Until then, the team had played on open grounds, but an arrangement was made to rent the Wallsend Amateur Bicycle Club's enclosure. The club was afforded senior status in 1895, and joined the Tyneside League. The team played in both the FA Cup and the FA Amateur Cup for the first time in 1896. They lost to Leadgate Exiles in the preliminary round of the FA Cup, and in the Amateur Cup, received a bye in the first qualifying round and beat Rutherford College in the second before being eliminated by Shankhouse in the third. They also reached the final of the Northumberland Senior Cup, losing to Willington Athletic; they were to win the trophy for the first and only time in 1901–02.

Wallsend were admitted to the Northern Alliance when Southwick resigned just before the 1896–97 season was due to start. They lost their first match 8–1, but recovered to finish third. They continued in the top half of the table, building up to a runners-up place in 1902–03 and winning the league title the following season. After four more seasons, which included another runners-up finish, in 1906–07, Wallsend joined the North Eastern League. They began with three mid-table finishes, but then slumped to 18th of 19 in 1911–12. A change of name, to plain Wallsend F.C., preceded a return to mid-table, but they finished bottom of the league in the two seasons before competition was abandoned for the duration of the First World War.

In the six seasons after the war, Wallsend's best placing was 15th of 20, although they did reach the fifth qualifying round of the FA Cup on three occasions. After finishing bottom in 1924–25, having conceded more than 100 goals in 38 matches, they left the North Eastern League and joined the Northern Alliance, only to return a season later, as the Alliance was absorbed into the North Eastern League as its second division. Wallsend were promoted as runners-up to Washington Colliery in 1927–28. After four seasons in mid-table at the higher level, they finished bottom in 1932–33 and were relegated, at which point the shareholders decided that the club, which had a deficit of £732, should be voluntarily wound up.

A successor club, formed shortly afterwards under the name of Wallsend Town A.F.C., also struggled financially. The team spent two seasons in the North Eastern League Second Division, then returned for one season to the re-formed Northern Alliance, in which they finished 10th of 12.

League participation

 1895–1897: Tyneside League
 1897–1908: Northern Football Alliance
 1908–1925: North-Eastern League
 1925–1926: Northern Football Alliance
 1926–1928: North-Eastern League Div 2
 1928–1933: North-Eastern League Div 1
 1933–1935: North-Eastern League Div 2
 1935–1936: Northern Football Alliance

Records
FA Cup
 Fifth Qualifying Round: 1903–04, 1919–20, 1921–22, 1923–24
FA Amateur Cup
 Semi-finals: 1896–97

References

External links

Defunct football clubs in England
Wallsend
Football clubs in Tyne and Wear
Association football clubs established in 1890
Association football clubs disestablished in 1933
1890 establishments in England
1933 disestablishments in England